The 1921 Five Nations Championship was the seventh series of the rugby union Five Nations Championship following the inclusion of France into the Home Nations Championship. Including the previous Home Nations Championships, this was the thirty-fourth series of the annual northern hemisphere rugby union championship. Ten matches were played between 15 January and 9 April. It was contested by England, France, Ireland, Scotland and Wales.

Table

Results

External links

1921
Five Nations
Five Nations
Five Nations
Five Nations
Five Nations
Five Nations
Five Nations Championship
Five Nations Championship
Five Nations Championship
Five Nations Championship